Camarota is a genus of fly in the family Chloropidae.

Species
 Camarota curvipennis (Latreille, 1805)

References

Chloropinae
Chloropidae genera
Monotypic Brachycera genera
Taxa named by Johann Wilhelm Meigen